Darrion Anthony Weems (born September 4, 1988) is a former American football offensive tackle in the National Football League turned Investor and TV producer. Darrion played for the Dallas Cowboys and Denver Broncos. He played college football at the University of Oregon.

Early years
Weems attended McMain High School, but was forced to move before his junior year due to Hurricane Katrina. He transferred to Taft High School, where he was named All-American.

He accepted a scholarship from the University of Oregon. As a junior, he started 7 games at both tackle positions. He became a regular starter at left tackle as a senior and was part of an offense that ranked third in the nation in scoring, sixth in total offense and fifth in rushing.

Professional career

Minnesota Vikings
On April 29, 2012, he signed with the Minnesota Vikings as an undrafted free agent..

New England Patriots
On July 27, 2012, he signed with the New England Patriots as a free agent.

Indianapolis Colts
On September 3, 2012, he was signed by the Indianapolis Colts to join their practice squad.

Denver Broncos (first stint)
On October 2, 2012, he was signed by the Denver Broncos.

Dallas Cowboys
On December 5, 2012, he was signed by the Dallas Cowboys from the Denver Broncos' practice squad and was declared inactive in the last 4 games. The next year, he was declared inactive for all of the regular season games. In 2014, he missed most of the preseason with a shoulder injury and was placed on the injured reserve list on September 17.

In 2015, the team lost Jermey Parnell in free agency and Weems entered training camp as the favorite to earn the swing tackle job..

Denver Broncos (second stint)
On January 13, 2016, he was signed by the Denver Broncos to a future contract. He appeared in 6 games at right guard. He decided to retire soon after due to a concussion.

References

External links
Oregon Ducks bio
Indianapolis Colts bio

1988 births
Living people
Players of American football from New Orleans
American football offensive tackles
Oregon Ducks football players
Indianapolis Colts players
Denver Broncos players
Dallas Cowboys players
William Howard Taft Charter High School alumni